Spiritual Archives is the fifth studio album by Delerium, released on June 12, 1991 through Dossier.

Track listing

The re-issue on the Hypnotic label omits "Barren Ground" in the album's artwork, but it is included on the actual disc.
The track "Rise Above" contains samples of the Armenian melody "Dle Yaman" played on the duduk.
The track "Aftermath" (7:38) is different from the earlier track "Aftermath" (7:12) released on Stone Tower and was released under the title "Aftermath II" on the compilations Reflections II and Archives II.

Personnel
Delerium
Rhys Fulber – instruments, production, mixing
Bill Leeb – instruments, production, mixing
Production and additional personnel
Chris Peterson – mixing
Steve Royea – additional mixing
Techno Grafix – illustrations

References

External links 
 

1991 albums
Delerium albums
Albums produced by Rhys Fulber

ru:Spiritual Archives